Frederick Godfrey Whitelaw (25 January 1878 – 30 March 1959) was an Australian rules footballer who played with St Kilda in the Victorian Football League (VFL).

References

External links 

1878 births
1959 deaths
Australian rules footballers from Melbourne
St Kilda Football Club players
People from Collingwood, Victoria